"18 Days" is the second single by American rock band Saving Abel from their self-titled debut album. It was released after the band's hit single "Addicted". "18 Days" reached #10 on the Billboard Hot Modern Rock Tracks chart and number six on the Hot Mainstream Rock Tracks chart. The song is also featured in Tapulous' hit iPhone OS games Tap Tap Revenge and Tap Tap Revenge 2.

Track listings
Digital single
"18 Days" (rock mix) — 3:50

Digital EP (18 Days Tour EP)
"18 Days" (acoustic version) — 3:48
"Goodbye" — 4:03
"Trying to Clear My Head" — 2:44

Charts

Weekly charts

Year-end charts

Release history

References 

2007 songs
2008 singles
Saving Abel songs
Virgin Records singles